Albert Moss (August 14, 1969 – September 10, 2001), better known by the stage name "DJ Uncle Al", was an American DJ based in Miami, Florida.

Moss was known for his trendsetting and innovative abilities in music producing and broadcasting as well as his philosophy of "peace in the hood" and non-violence in the community. He was shot and killed on September 10, 2001.

Biography
Moss graduated from Miami Northwestern High School. In Miami, he gained his experience and popularity over the course of several years. The not-for-profit foundation was named in recognition of his life's works, promotion of non-violence and constant willingness to help others in the business.

DJ Uncle Al "Peace in the Hood" Festival

The DJ Uncle Al "Peace in the Hood" festival is an annual festival that is held in the Liberty City area of Miami in honor of Moss. It promotes his philosophy of "peace in the hood."

References

External links

The List of Murdered Deejays, Hosts, and Radio Personalities, article identifying murdered DJs and radio hosts, including DJ Uncle Al 
You Coulda Called Him Al, article exploring the Miami pirate radio dispute which was allegedly the catalyst for DJ Uncle Al's murder

1969 births
2001 deaths
2001 murders in the United States
American DJs
Musicians from Miami
Murdered African-American people
Male murder victims
American murder victims
People murdered in Florida
Deaths by firearm in Florida
20th-century American musicians
20th-century African-American musicians